Proprioseiopsis dacus is a species of mite in the family Phytoseiidae.

References

dacus
Articles created by Qbugbot
Animals described in 1973